Zoran Vrkić (born 16 August 1987) is a Croatian professional basketball player who plays for Grindavík of the Úrvalsdeild karla.

Playing career
Vrkić helped Manama Club win the Bahrain league in 2020. He began the 2020–21 season with Patrioti Levice, averaging 11.3 points, 2.2 rebounds, 1.7 assists and 1.0 steal per game in six games. Vrkić signed with Exxon Sport Club on 18 November 2020.

In 2021, he signed with Alkar of the HT Premijer liga. He averaged 9.0 points, 2.8 rebounds, and 2.8 assists per game.

In December 2021, Vrkić signed with Tindastóll of the Icelandic Úrvalsdeild karla. During the season, he averaged 8.7 points and 4.4 rebounds. On 24 January 2023, he was released by the club after averaging 7.7 points and 4.1 rebounds. Three days later, he signed with rival Úrvalsdeild club Grindavík.

References

External links
 Zoran Vrkić at ACB.com 
 Zoran Vrkić at Eurobasket.com
 Zoran Vrkić at FIBA.com
 Zoran Vrkić at Realgm.com

1987 births
Living people
ABA League players
Basketball players from Rijeka
Bilbao Basket players
BK Patrioti Levice players
Croatian expatriate basketball people in Bahrain
Croatian expatriate basketball people in Greece
Croatian expatriate basketball people in Iceland
Croatian expatriate basketball people in Iran
Croatian expatriate basketball people in Italy
Croatian expatriate basketball people in Mexico
Croatian expatriate basketball people in North Macedonia
Croatian expatriate basketball people in Romania
Croatian expatriate basketball people in Slovakia
Croatian expatriate basketball people in Slovenia
Croatian expatriate basketball people in Spain
Croatian expatriate basketball people in Taiwan
Croatian men's basketball players
Fortitudo Pallacanestro Bologna players
Gipuzkoa Basket players
GKK Šibenik players
Grindavík men's basketball players
Ikaros B.C. players
Kinmen Kaoliang Liquor basketball players
KK Alkar players
KK Olimpija players
KK Šibenik players
KK Split players
KK Zadar players
Liga ACB players
Oviedo CB players
Peristeri B.C. players
Small forwards
Super Basketball League imports
Ungmennafélagið Tindastóll men's basketball players
Úrvalsdeild karla (basketball) players